List of hospitals in New Hampshire (U.S. state), sorted by location and then hospital name. Hospitals are designated as trauma centers as verified by the American College of Surgeons.

Belknap County

Laconia
Concord Hospital-Laconia (formerly Lakes Region General Hospital)

Carroll County

North Conway
Memorial Hospital

Wolfeboro
Huggins Hospital

Cheshire County

Keene
Cheshire Medical Center

Coös County

Berlin
Androscoggin Valley Hospital

Colebrook
Upper Connecticut Valley Hospital

Lancaster
Weeks Medical Center

Grafton County

Lebanon
Alice Peck Day Hospital
Dartmouth-Hitchcock Medical Center
Level I Trauma Center
Dartmouth Cancer Center

Littleton
Littleton Regional Hospital

Plymouth
Speare Memorial Hospital

Woodsville
Cottage Hospital

Hillsborough County

Manchester
Catholic Medical Center
Level III Trauma Center
Elliot Hospital
Level II Trauma Center
VA Medical Center

Milford
Milford Medical Center

Nashua
Southern New Hampshire Medical Center
St. Joseph Hospital

Peterborough
Monadnock Community Hospital

Merrimack County

Concord
Concord Hospital
Level II Trauma Center
Encompass Health Rehabilitation Hospital of Concord
New Hampshire Hospital

Franklin
Concord Hospital-Franklin (formerly Franklin Regional Hospital)

New London
New London Hospital

Rockingham County

Derry
Parkland Medical Center

Exeter
Exeter Hospital

Hampstead
Hampstead Hospital

Portsmouth
Portsmouth Regional Hospital
Level II Trauma Center

Salem
Northeast Rehabilitation Hospital

Strafford County

Dover
Wentworth-Douglass Hospital

Rochester
Frisbie Memorial Hospital

Sullivan County

Claremont
Valley Regional Hospital

Defunct

Sacred Heart Hospital
Portsmouth Cottage Hospital

References

Licensed Health Facilities in New Hampshire. Retrieved 2011-03-27.

New Hampshire
 
Hospitals